Giulio Oberhammer (b. 14 December 1935 - d. 24 May 2009) is an Italian ice hockey player. He competed in the men's tournaments at the 1956 Winter Olympics and the 1964 Winter Olympics.

References

External links

1935 births
2009 deaths
Ice hockey players at the 1956 Winter Olympics
Ice hockey players at the 1964 Winter Olympics
Olympic ice hockey players of Italy
People from Cortina d'Ampezzo
Sportspeople from the Province of Belluno